The 1939 Drake Bulldogs football team was an American football represented Drake University in the Missouri Valley Conference (MVC) during the 1939 college football season. In its seventh season under head coach Vee Green, the team compiled a 5–5 record (2–3 against MVC opponents), finished fourth in the MVC, and was outscored by a total of 104 to 83.

Schedule

References

Drake
Drake Bulldogs football seasons
Drake Bulldogs football